Holzneria is a genus of flowering plants belonging to the family Plantaginaceae.

Its native range is Iran to Central Asia and Afghanistan. It is found in the countries of Afghanistan, Iran, Kazakhstan, Kyrgyzstan, Tajikistan, Turkmenistan and Uzbekistan.

The genus name of Holzneria is in honour of Wolfgang Holzner (1942–2014), Austrian botanist, Japanologist, and professor in Vienna.
It was first described and published by Franz Speta in Bot. Jahrb. Syst. Vol.103 on page 16 in 1982.

Known species, according to Kew
Holzneria microcentron 
Holzneria spicata

References

Plantaginaceae
Plantaginaceae genera
Plants described in 1845
Flora of Afghanistan 
Flora of Iran
Flora of Central Asia